United States general surveillance radar stations include Army and USAF stations of various US air defense networks (in reverse chronological order):
Joint Surveillance System (JSS), with radar stations controlled by joint FAA/USAF ROCCs beginning in 1980
SAGE radar stations, for the Semi-Automatic Ground Environment network prior to the JSS (the 1st SAGE squadrons were designated in 1958)
Alaska Ring radar net, the radar stations of Alaskan Air Command 
Permanent System radar stations, the Air Defense Command manual network of radar stations prior to deployment of SAGE
Lashup Radar Network radar stations, the radar stations deployed 1950-2 when the "Radar Fence" Plan was not approved
Temporary radar net, the "five-station radar net" established in 1948
Army Radar Stations, World War II installations of the Aircraft Warning Service with radars (cf. filter centers, Ground Observer Corps stations, etc.)

By usage:
RBS Express sites, temporary stations for Radar Bomb Scoring trains which had AN/MPS-9 general surveillance radars
Nike Integrated Fire Control sites, with general surveillance radars  used to acquire the target (i.e., defense acquisition radar, "ACQR", such as the General Electric AN/MPQ-43 High Power Acquisition Radar)
Army Air Defense Command Posts, which used general surveillance radars for coordinating fire from several Nike batteries (e.g., FAA Air Route Surveillance Radars at JUSS radar stations like Fort Heath)

Cold War-related lists
Military installations of the United States
Radar stations